The Mercedes-Benz AMG C-Class W204 DTM is a DTM-championship touring car constructed by the German car manufacturer Mercedes-Benz. It was the facelift version of the Mercedes-Benz AMG C-Class W203 DTM and based on the Mercedes-Benz C-Class W204 second generation car. The Mercedes-Benz AMG C-Class W204 DTM was unveiled at the 2007 Geneva Motor Show.

Technical details 
Like all racing cars in the DTM it is based on the C-Class W203 DTM and looked like the eponymous series cars. The prototype was constructed on a CFK - monocoque chassis with an integrated 15.4-imperial gallons fuel tank. Since refuelling at this time was still allowed in the race, a 26.4-imperial gallons tank was not built as from 2012. The rear-wheel drive C-Class DTM also has a sequential 6-speed sports transmission, a 3-plate carbon fiber clutch supplied by Sandtler (2007-2010), then ZF (2011) and an adjustable multi-disc limited-slip differential.

References

External links 
 Mercedes-Benz Motorsport website

DTM (W204)
Deutsche Tourenwagen Masters cars